The 2017 CollegeInsider.com Postseason Tournament (CIT) was a postseason single-elimination tournament of 26 NCAA Division I basketball teams. The tournament was played March 13–31, 2017.

Participants who belonged to "mid-major" conferences and who were not invited to the 2017 NCAA tournament or the National Invitation Tournament make up the field.

After all 26 teams played in the first round, the top-three highest rated teams based on the Pomeroy College Basketball Ratings regular season rating automatically advanced to the quarterfinals.

Saint Peter's beat Texas A&M–Corpus Christi 62–61 in the championship game.

Participating teams
The following teams received an invitation to the 2017 CIT:

Format
The CIT uses the old NIT model in which there is no set bracket. Future round opponents are determined by the results of the previous round. After all 26 teams played in the first round, the top-three highest rated teams based on the Pomeroy College Basketball Ratings regular season rating automatically advanced to the quarterfinals.

Postseason classics
In 2016, the CIT introduced the Coach John McLendon Classic as the first "Classic" game to ever be played during postseason tournament. For 2017, the CIT introduced three more "Classic" games, for a total of four, all to be played in the first round.

Coach John McLendon Classic
Hugh Durham Classic
Lou Henson Classic
Riley Wallace Classic

The winners of each Classic received a trophy and advanced to the second round or quarterfinals if they received a second round bye.

Schedule

Bracket
Bracket is for visual purposes only. The CIT does not have a set bracket.

Home teams listed second.

References

CollegeInsider.com
CollegeInsider.com Postseason Tournament